Lindsey Maguire (born 15 January 1982) is a British rower who competed at the 2012 Summer Olympics.

Personal life
Maguire was born in Edinburgh, Scotland. Her mother is former long jumper, Moira Walls. Maguire studied maths and psychology at the University of Birmingham. She then completed a Masters in Developmental Psychopathology at Durham University (Ustinov College) in 2004.

Rowing career
She was part of the British squad that topped the medal table at the 2011 World Rowing Championships in Bled, where she won a bronze medal as part of the eight with Alison Knowles, Jo Cook, Jessica Eddie, Louisa Reeve, Natasha Page, Katie Greves, Victoria Thornley and Caroline O'Connor.

She finished fifth in the women's eight at the 2012 Olympic Games.

References

External links 
 
 Lindsey Maguire at British Rowing (archived)
 
 

1982 births
Living people
British female rowers
Sportspeople from Edinburgh
Rowers at the 2012 Summer Olympics
Olympic rowers of Great Britain
Scottish female rowers
World Rowing Championships medalists for Great Britain
Alumni of Ustinov College, Durham
Alumni of the University of Birmingham
Durham University Boat Club rowers
European Rowing Championships medalists